Nipples & Palm Trees is a 2012 American sex comedy film directed by Dylan Reynolds, written by Matthew James, and starring James, Sadie Katz, Akihiro Kitamura, and Vanessa Rose Parker.

Plot summary 
After having trouble with his girlfriend, a painter named Jackson searches Los Angeles to find love, though he mostly finds casual sex.

Cast 
 Matthew James as Jackson
 Sadie Katz as Harmony
 Akihiro Kitamura as Phil
 Vanessa Rose Parker as Liz
 Cary Thompson as Cary
 Will Morales as Al
 Jackie Kamm as C. C.

Release 
Nipples & Palm Trees was released theatrically July 13, 2012, and on DVD November 6, 2012.  Hulu picked it up in October 2014.

Reception 
Robert Koehler of Variety wrote that the film is too incompetent to be funny.  Gary Goldstein of the Los Angeles Times described it as "a dreary, dirty-talking sex comedy from the you've-got-to-be-kidding-me school of filmmaking".  Michael Nordine of LA Weekly wrote, "Though Nipples and Palm Trees isn't without its eventual charms, the film is too content, for too long, to dwell on unfunny sleaze and thinly-sketched characters."  HorrorCultFilms rated it 8/10 stars and called it "quite possibly the biggest surprise of the year".

References

External links 
 
 
 

2012 films
2010s sex comedy films
American independent films
American sex comedy films
2010s English-language films
Films set in Los Angeles
2012 comedy films
2012 independent films
2010s American films